Chen Kun (born February 4, 1976), sometimes credited as Aloys Chen, is a Chinese actor and singer. He gained recognition from television dramas Love Story in Shanghai and The Story of a Noble Family and rose to international prominence with the films The Knot and Painted Skin. Chen has won the Hundred Flowers Award for Best Actor, Huabiao Award for Outstanding Actor, and received a Golden Horse Award nomination for Best Actor.

Chen ranked 68th on Forbes China Celebrity 100 list in 2014, 28th in 2014, 15th in 2017, and 52nd in 2019.

Biography
Chen Kun was born in Chongqing. He was raised by his maternal grandmother. His parents divorced soon after Chen's second younger brother was born, and Chen began working part-time in high school to support his mother. He started as a typist at the municipal office and later as a solo singer at night clubs. He showed early talent in singing and was strongly recommended by his vocal trainer and mentor to join the China Oriental Song and Dance Ensemble (now China National Song and Dance Ensemble) at Beijing in 1995. In 1996, he was admitted to the Beijing Film Academy, where he began taking acting classes.

In 2010, Chen established his own agency K Pictures (Dongshen Tonghua). He then set up a series of public charities named "Power to Go", aimed to encourage people to simply go outside and walk, in an effort to improve their health and spirit. The events were held on separate occasions in Qinghai and Tibet. In 2012, he published and co-authored the book Heading East, in the Direction of Peace (往西，宁静的方向), the first in a series of five books promoting the charity program. Chen was crowned as the "Weibo King" at the 2013 Sina Weibo Night for his popularity, influence and philanthropy work on the micro-blogging site. He was also the "Philanthropy King" at the 2014 iQiyi Awards Night.

Chen is also a keen writer, having published and co-authored several books. His first book Suddenly Walked to Tibet (突然就走到了西藏) was published in 2011, and contains a collection of autobiographical essays. It was a huge commercial success, and Chen became the first and only actor to make it on to China's Writers Rich List. In 2014, he also published Strange Aquarius (鬼水瓶录), a short-story collection that takes inspiration from his Weibo posts and life story.

Personal Life 
Although he is not married, Chen has one son born in 2002 named Chen Zunyou (Youyou). Chen does not intend to reveal the identity of Youyou's mother.

Career

1999–2004: Debut and rising popularity
Chen debuted in the 1999 film The National Anthem. He rose to prominence with the 2001 television drama Love in Shanghai. His role as a poor clock repairer who manages to get through to a girl from a wealthy family suffering from infantile autism, made him an audience favorite.

Chen gained more international recognition in 2002, after starring in Franco-Chinese romance film Balzac and the Little Chinese Seamstress. The film was nominated at the Golden Globe Awards for Golden Globe Award for Best Foreign Language Film.

He then starred in the Republican series The Story of a Noble Family (2003), adapted from the novel of the same name by Zhang Henshui. The series was a commercial success, and recorded the highest ratings of the year. The role of Jin Yanxi became his most prolific work in his earlier years.

2005–2016: Films and acclaim
Chen then starred in A West Lake Moment (2005), playing a love-seeking and idealistic young man who is not easily satisfied. He was nominated as Best Actor for his performance at the Golden Horse Awards. He next starred in The Music Box (2006), which earned him the Best Actor accolade at the Shanghai Film Critics Awards for capturing his screen character's years of arduous life and as well as his struggles and joys.

Chen rose to international prominence with The Knot (2007). He described the role as a "big challenge" to him, as he had to portray the maturing process of his character over 20 years. The film was a huge success and garnered 8 nominations at the 16th Golden Rooster Awards, including Best Actor for Chen. He also won Best Actor at the 2007 Huabiao Film Awards. He next starred in Gordon Chan's horror-adventure film Painted Skin (2008), which won him the Best Actor award at the Hundred Flowers Awards.

To commemorate the 60th anniversary of the founding of the People's Republic of China, Chen participated in the patriotic tribute The Founding of a Republic (2009). He played Chiang Ching-kuo, and was praised by the media and critics alike for his excellent portrayal of a passionate nationalist who was unable to prevent the fall of his party. He then played his first antagonist role in Jiang Wen's gangster film Let the Bullets Fly (2010).

Chen starred in wuxia film Flying Swords of Dragon Gate directed by Tsui Hark in 2011. His dynamic portrayal of two distinct characters; the cold and cruel Yu Huatian and the witty and humorous Feng Lidao, won him Best Actor nominations at the Asian Film Awards and Hundred Flowers Awards. The dual roles marked a turning point in Chen's popularity and acting career, and has become one of his most representative works to date.

Chen played the role of Qian Xuesen in the biopic of the author released in 2012. He received critical acclaim for his capturing his character's growth from young to old, and was awarded the Best Actor award at the Shanghai Film Critics Awards for the second time. The same year, he starred in Painted Skin: The Resurrection, the sequel to Painted Skin. The film grossed over 700 million yuan ($109.8 million), becoming the highest-grossing Chinese-language movie of all time then.

Chen then starred in Bends, which was screened in the Un Certain Regard section at the 2013 Cannes Film Festival. Chen won the Best Actor award at the 2013 International du Film de Femmes de Sale held in Morocco.

Chen starred in fantasy epics in 2015; Zhong Kui: Snow Girl and the Dark Crystal as well as Mojin: The Lost Legend where he played Hu Bayi, the main character of the popular tomb-raiding novel series. Mojin was a huge commercial success, breaking the box office record for a local language IMAX film in China.

In 2016, Chen starred alongside Bai Baihe in crime caper film Chongqing Hot Pot. The film received acclaim and positive word-of-mouth, grossing 152 million yuan in four days. He also made a special appearance in the romantic comedy Beautiful Accident opposite his Rest on Your Shoulder co-star Gwei Lun-mei. The same year, Chen co-produced and starred in his first television variety Twenty Four Hours. The first episode was broadcast on January 21 on Zhejiang Television and ranked first in ratings.

2017–present: Return to television
In 2018, Chen starred in republican spy drama Lost in 1949 as twin brothers, and historical drama The Rise of Phoenixes as a calculating and ambitious royal prince. These two dramas are co-produced by Chen himself, and also mark his return to the small screen after a decade.

Chen is set to star in the wuxia film The Weary Poet, and fantasy film The Yinyang Master, adapted from Ohmyoji game.

In 2021, he was selected as jury member at 11th Beijing International Film Festival for Tiantan Awards.

Music
Apart from acting, Chen is also an established singer. He frequently performs theme songs for his television series and has released three full-length studio albums.
Chen made his debut as a singer in 2004 with the album Osmosis. He then released his second album Make It Come True Again, won him Most Popular Male Vocalist at the MTV Asia Awards. To support his third album Mystery&Me, he held his first solo concert in Beijing in February 2010. He wrote the lyrics to the single "Power to Go", which he released for a philanthropy program to advocate environmental awareness and protection.

Brand endorsements and brand ambassadors 
In 2012, Chen Kun's wax figure entered the Madame Tussauds Museum in Shanghai and became the second wax figure of a famous Chinese actor in the museum's collection. He has also been designated as China's Goodwill Ambassador by UNICEF

In 2014, he became the product ambassador of Huawei's honorary brand in China.

In 2015, Chen became the global ambassador of the Giorgio Armani brand and the luxury watch brand Baume & Mercier.

In 2017, he became the spokesperson for the skin care brand Fresh in China and the brand spokesperson for Motorola's new flagship mobile phone moto in 2018

Filmography

Film

Television series

Discography

Accolades

Endorsements and Ambassadorship

Chen was appointed as one of the goodwill ambassadors for China-ROK Exchange Year in 2007. He was also appointed as UNICEF Ambassador for China.

In 2012, Chen became the second Chinese male celebrity to have a wax figure of himself displayed at Madam Tussaud in Shanghai.

In 2014, he became the product ambassador of Huawei's Honor brand in China.

In 2015, Chen became the global ambassador of Giorgio Armani and luxury watch brand Baume et Mercier.

References

External links

1976 births
21st-century Chinese male actors
Beijing Film Academy alumni
Male actors from Chongqing
Singers from Chongqing
Living people
Chinese male film actors
Chinese male television actors
Chinese Mandopop singers
21st-century Chinese male singers